Paul Béranger (11 April 1892 – 27 December 1942) was a French discus thrower. He competed at the 1924 Summer Olympics and finished in 14th place.

References

1892 births
1942 deaths
French male discus throwers
Olympic athletes of France
Athletes (track and field) at the 1924 Summer Olympics